Northwest Dallas is an area consisting of many communities and neighborhoods in Dallas, Texas, (USA).

Geography 
The area is bordered by I-635 to the North, Stemmons Freeway to the West, the Dallas North Tollway to the East and to the South it goes to the junction of I-35E and the Dallas North Tollway.  There are a number of residential and commercial neighborhoods in Northwest Dallas. Of particular note are Love Field, home of Dallas Love Field airport, and the Stemmons Corridor, a stretch of hotels and office towers along Interstate 35E. The Asian Trade District is located just south of the I-35E/I-635 junction.

Northwest Dallas is also home to Bachman Lake, a small freshwater lake, fed by the Bachman Branch of the Trinity River.

Government 
The Federal Bureau of Investigation Dallas Field Office is in Northwest Dallas.

Education 
The Dallas Independent School District serves Northwest Dallas.

DISD operates the Alfred J. Loos Athletic Complex in Addison, near Northwest Dallas.

Transportation

Trains

Light rail 
DART:  and  listed south to north
Medical/Market Center Station
Southwestern Medical District/Parkland Station
Inwood Station
Love Field Station
Burbank Station
Bachman Station
DART:  only listed south to north
Walnut Hill/Denton Station
Royal Lane Station

Highways 
  Interstate 35E
  Interstate 635

References

External links